Loweswater is a village and civil parish in the county of Cumbria, England.

Village
It is overlooked by the peak of Mellbreak.

The village church, dedicated to St Bartholomew, was built in 1827, and restored in 1884, although there has been a place of worship in the village since the early 12th century. Near to the church is the popular Kirkstile Inn.

Civil parish
The civil parish of Loweswater covers a considerable area around the village, and is bordered on its eastern side by the western shore of Crummock Water and by the River Cocker. To the north-west, the parish boundary is delineated by the summit of Fellbarrow, before encircling Loweswater lake via Low Fell and the A5086 road. From here, the parish boundary  includes a large area of fell to the north and east of the summits of Blake Fell, Gavel Fell, Great Borne, Starling Dodd and Red Pike, before descending to Crummock Water.

Besides the village of Loweswater itself, the parish also includes the settlement of Mockerkin, to the west of Loweswater lake. Most of the parish lies within the Lake District National Park, but a small part at its western end, including Mockerkin, is outside the National Park. At the time of the 2001 census the parish had a population of 209 living in 92 households.

For local government purposes the civil parish forms part of the district of Allerdale within the county of Cumbria. It is within the Workington constituency of the United Kingdom Parliament. Prior to Brexit in 2020, it was part of the North West England constituency of the European Parliament.

See also

Listed buildings in Loweswater, Cumbria

References

External links
 Cumbria County History Trust: Loweswater (nb: provisional research only – see Talk page)

 
Villages in Cumbria
Civil parishes in Cumbria
Allerdale